Ittibittium is a genus of very small sea snails, marine gastropod mollusks in the family Cerithiidae.

Species
 Limatium aureum E. E. Strong & Bouchet, 2018
 Limatium pagodula E. E. Strong & Bouchet, 2018

References

External links
 
 Strong E. E. & Bouchet P. (2018). A rare and unusual new bittiine genus with two new species from the South Pacific (Cerithiidae, Gastropoda). ZooKeys. 758: 1-18.

Cerithiidae